Anton Aleksandrovich Igumnov (born 6 June 1985), professionally known as Tony Igy, is a Russian electronic dance music artist. He is best known for his hit "Astronomia", which was originally released in 2010. A 2019 Stephan F remix of "Astronomia" became a global phenomenon in April 2020 as part of the Coffin dance meme.

Discography

Albums
 Get Up (2013) 
 You Know My Name (2019)

Extended plays
 This Is My Gift and This My Curse (2010)
 It's Beautiful... It's Enough (2017)

Singles
2010
 "Astronomia" (Free-Track)
2014
 "Astronomia" (Free-Track; with Vicetone)

2015
 "Run Away" (featuring Bella Blue)
 "Open Fire"
2016
 "Don’t Turn Around" (featuring Syntheticsax)
 "Nelly"
 "Day in Day Out" (with X-Chrome)
2017
 "Caruna"
 "Because of You"
 "Another"
 "Nuera"
 "Let’s Run"
 "I Can See"
 "For You Special"
 "The Dust"
 "Starlight"
 "Sentiment"
 "Misterio"
 "Meduzza"
 "I Wanna See You Now"
 "Civik"
 "The One for Me"
 "Playing"
 "Island"
 "Change"
2018
 "Yes I Do"
 "Show You How"
 "Roscoe’s (Shout Louder)"
 "Take Me Away" (with Gio Nailati featuring Hoshi Soul)
2020
 "Street Sadness"
 "Happy Land"
 "Astronomia (Never Go Home)"

References

Russian electronic musicians
Russian techno musicians
1985 births
Living people
BLP articles lacking sources from May 2020